is a Japanese manga series by Kazurou Inoue. It was published by Shogakukan in the magazine Weekly Shōnen Sunday from September 2002 to July 2004, with its chapters collected in eight tankōbon volumes. The manga was licensed in North America by Viz Media. The series follows Seiji Sawamura, who one day finds his right hand replaced with a girl named Midori Kasugano and his attempts to return her to her real body.

The series was adapted as a 13-episode anime television series produced by Pierrot, broadcast from April to June 2004. The anime series was licensed in North America by Media Blasters.

Plot
Seiji Sawamura is the toughest student in his high school. His grades are not very good because he fights more than he studies, but he tends to protect the weaker students from bullies. A few classmates idolize him; one (Midori Kasugano from a different school) shyly loves him from afar; but everybody else is just afraid of him, which has made it impossible for him to find a girlfriend. In desperation, he says to himself that he wants a girlfriend no matter who it is. He then notices a miniature Midori attached to where his right hand used to be. Because of this, the pair must learn how to adapt to this sudden and forced closeness.

Characters

Main characters

A 16-year-old girl who ends up as Seiji's right hand. She has had a crush on him for three years. One day, she wishes to be with him, so much so that she finds herself in the place of his right hand. This causes problems for him, since it is his "Devil's Right Hand" that he punches with. Midori's real body is in a coma, and her mother tries everything to bring her back.

A 17-year-old delinquent student who is feared for his fighting skills. Seiji fights to protect the weak using his powerful "Devil's Right Hand", and is nicknamed "Mad Dog" Sawamura. Fighting people has a price, however: everyone, including girls, fear him. He has gone seventeen years without a girlfriend and wants one badly.

Secondary characters

The class representative for Seiji's class. She originally detested him, but after Seiji saves her from a gang, she begins to harbor a secret attraction to him. Unfortunately for her, all of her plans to confess her feelings to him fail, either through Seiji's obliviousness or outside circumstances.

Seiji's violent older sister. She is the former leader of a powerful street gang, and her favorite hobbies are drinking, beating up Seiji, and taking his allowance. She was the one who taught him how to fight when they were young.

A childhood friend of Midori's who is also a fellow first year at Ogurabashi High School. He was always in love with Midori, but over the course of the series, he manages to develop feelings for Seiji that make the miniature Midori extremely nervous.

A year-younger student at Seiji's school and kōhai or underclassman of Seiji. He idolizes Seiji for his fighting skills and is arguably the closest thing to a friend Seiji had before Midori. However, he seemingly can not keep himself out of trouble as he constantly gets caught by rival gangs.

A classmate of Seiji's who is a doll otaku. He always carries around a doll of a fictional anime character named Ultra-Marin, and seems to have a creepy obsession with the character. He is also good at making clothes for dolls, a talent which means an expanded wardrobe for the miniature Midori when he finds out Seiji's secret.

A 10-year-old neighbor of Seiji's who has a crush on him. She tries a variety of ways to gain his attention, even going as far as asking Rin what kind of woman Seiji likes. However, he never takes her advances seriously as he still treats her like a child.

Midori's mother who is worried about her. Haruka is willing to do anything to cure Midori of her illness. She is very sad about Midori's coma and tries several times to bring her back.

Other characters

She is an American exchange student who transferred into Seiji's high school (more precisely, into Miyahara's class). She loves Japanese pop culture, especially samurai movies, and admires Seiji because she sees him as an ideal Japanese man.

A silent, mysterious girl in Seiji's class. She loves strange phenomena, and thus takes an interest in Seiji's transformed right hand. She seemingly appears at the strangest times, which gives Seiji quite a scare.

Nao's father who is a doctor. He always attempts to capture Seiji so he can dissect him to show Midori to the medical community and gain fame from his findings. While his attempts are usually foiled by Nao, Seiji and Midori occasionally do this as well.

Rin's boyfriend, Sakisaka is a treasure hunter and loves to travel the world. However, his constant disappearances annoy Rin to no end.

She is the leader of the Crimson Angels (Kurenai Benten), an all-female gang who constantly harasses and embarrasses Kouta (most notably by dressing him up in girl's clothing). Despite this, she has a soft spot for the boy and later helps him out when he tries to separate Seiji and Midori.

Yukina Asano is Seiji's first (sort of) girlfriend and childhood sweetheart. She had become friends with him when they were both 10 years old, but since she had to move away, they did not see each other for seven years until a chance meeting at a place of mutual memory.

An 11th-grader who is one of the popular and best students at Seiji's school, and the daughter of a trading company's chairman. For her popularity, she has earned the unofficial nickname kamakiri fujin ("praying mantis").

Media

Manga

Midori Days, written and illustrated by Kazurou Inoue, was serialized in Shogakukan's shōnen manga magazine Weekly Shōnen Sunday from September 18, 2002, to July 21, 2004. The 85 individual chapters were collected into eight tankōbon volumes, published from January 18, 2003, to October 18, 2004.

The series was licensed in North America by Viz Media, in Singapore by Chuang Yi, and in Australia by Madman Entertainment.

Anime
An anime television series adaptation by Pierrot aired on tvk and other UHF stations from April 4 to June 27, 2004. The series was directed by Tsuneo Kobayashi, with Yuko Kusumoto providing the character designs and Yoshihisa Hirano composing the music. CooRie performed the opening theme , while Saori Atsumi performed the ending theme . The series was licensed in North America by Media Blasters.

Episode list

Notes

References

External links
  
  
  
  
 

2002 manga
2004 anime television series debuts
Madman Entertainment anime
Madman Entertainment manga
Media Blasters
Pierrot (company)
Romantic comedy anime and manga
School life in anime and manga
Shogakukan manga
Shōnen manga
Viz Media manga
Juvenile delinquency in fiction